Francesco da Fabriano (2 September 1251 - 22 April 1322) - born Francesco Venimbeni - was an Italian Roman Catholic professed member from the Order of Friars Minor. He was a noted writer on various theological and biblical matters and was known for his great breadth of theological knowledge that characterized his religious life.

Pope Pius VI beatified the Franciscan friar on 1 April 1775.

Life
Francesco Venimbeni was born in Fabriano in the Papal States on 2 September 1251 to pious and humble parents. His father was a prominent doctor well-loved for his abilities and his love of the poor and ill. He recited the Divine Office in his childhood and knew Latin at the time he turned ten in 1261. In 1268 he knew he would pursue the religious life and his pleased parents consented to this.

He suffered a severe illness in his childhood but healed fast after his mother took him on a pilgrimage to the tomb of Francis of Assisi. It was there that Angelo da Clareno - an associate of the late Francis - saw him and foretold to his mother that little Francesco would become a Franciscan in the future.

He completed his humanities and philosophical studies before asking for admission into the Order of Friars Minor at their local convent in 1267 where he was under the direction of Father Gartian. He applied himself to theological studies as well. He purchased - with his father's own funds - a handsome scale of books and other publications for the convent and this was the first on an extended scale established in the order itself. He loved to call it the "best workshop in the convent" and its catalogue - of which Luke Wadding mentioned - contains works of the Church Fathers as well as mathematicians and preachers. There was also works of theological and biblical commentators. Mark of Lisbon dubbed the friar as a "most learned man and renowned preacher".

Francesco was convinced that the order had to announce well-grounded and authentic doctrine in unambiguous language and he soon became viewed as a far-sighted and progressive member of the order with an emphasis on the promotion of theological education.

Little of his spiritual writings has been published and these include:
 Chronica Marchiæ et Fabriani
 De veritate et excellentiâ Indulgentiæ S. Mariæ de Portiuncula
 Opusculum de serie et gestis Ministrorum Generalium
These three particular writings all perhaps formed one extensive chronicle but have disappeared save a few fragments bearing on Franciscan historical accounts. He also published an "Ars Prædicantium" and numerous sermons as well as one he gave upon the death of Giovanni di Fidanza. His book on the Portiuncula came about when he travelled to Assisi to receive the indulgence; he learned there that Brother Leo - companion of Francis of Assisi - was still alive.

The friar died on 22 April 1322 and had predicted the date of his own death. He is buried in Fabriano.

Beatification
The beatification for the late friar was celebrated on 1 April 1755 after Pope Pius VI approved the late friar's "cultus" - otherwise known as popular and longstanding devotion.

References

Attribution
  The entry cites:
"A biography was written by his nephew, Dominic Fessi, and other contemporary  writers. Luke Wadding has collected and utilized their accounts for his Annals".
Pulignani, Miscell. Francesc., X, 69 sq. "enumerates the more recent  biographers, and recommends especially two books by Luigi Tasso: Discorso laudatorio del B. Francesco Venimbeni da Fabriano (Fabriano, 1881), and Vita del B. Francesco da Fabriano dell' ordine dei Minori (Fabriano, 1893). The latter contains a brief treatise by Francis, and his elegy on St. Bonaventure. Extracts from his Chronicle have been edited by Pulignani, op. cit., 69-72. Cf." 
De Clary, LAureole Seraph., tr. Lives of the Saints and Blessed of the three Orders of St. Francis (Taunton, 1882) II, 171-175; 
Wadding, Annales (Rome, 1731 ), III, 244, 245, IV, 276-278, 400, VI, 377-385; 
___, Scriptores (Rome, 1659), 115; 
Sbaralea, Supplementum (Rome, 1806), 252; Acta Sanctorum'' (Venice, 1734-), April, III, 88-94.

External links
Santi e Beati

1251 births
1322 deaths
14th-century venerated Christians
13th-century Italian Roman Catholic priests
14th-century Italian Roman Catholic priests
Beatifications by Pope Pius VI
Franciscans
Franciscan beatified people
Franciscan writers
Italian beatified people
Italian Friars Minor
Italian Franciscans
People from Fabriano
Venerated Catholics